The Originals is an American supernatural drama television series created by Julie Plec for The CW. A spin-off of The Vampire Diaries, the series makes use of certain characters and story elements from the series of books of the same name. The first season premiered with a special preview on October 3, 2013, following the season premiere of its parent series, before premiering in its regular time slot on October 8, 2013.

The show is set in New Orleans which the Mikaelson family and Original vampires helped to build. In the first season, the focus is primarily on Klaus (Joseph Morgan), Elijah (Daniel Gillies), and Rebekah (Claire Holt), who discover in the series's backdoor pilotwhich aired on April 25, 2013, as an episode of The Vampire Diariesthat Hayley Marshall (Phoebe Tonkin) is pregnant with Klaus' child.

Having fled the city many years ago, they return to find Klaus' former protégé, Marcel (Charles Michael Davis), in control of the French Quarter. Klaus decides to take back the city and enlists Elijah and Rebekah's help. The show also revolves around their relationship with other supernatural beings such as witches.

Cast

Main 
 Joseph Morgan as Niklaus "Klaus" Mikaelson
 Daniel Gillies as Elijah Mikaelson
 Claire Holt as Rebekah Mikaelson
 Phoebe Tonkin as Hayley Marshall 
 Charles Michael Davis as Marcellus "Marcel" Gerard
 Daniella Pineda as Sophie Deveraux
 Leah Pipes as Camille "Cami" O'Connell
 Danielle Campbell as Davina Claire

Recurring 
 Shannon Kane as Sabine Laurent (possessed by Celeste Dubois)
 Eka Darville as Diego
 Callard Harris as Thierry Vanchure
 Sebastian Roché as Mikael
 Malaya Rivera Drew as Jane-Anne Deveraux
 Karen Kaia Livers as Agnes
 Steven Krueger as Joshua "Josh" Rosza
 Alexandra Metz as Katie
 Raney Branch as Celeste DuBois
 Shane Coffey as Timothy
 Todd Stashwick as Kieran O'Connell
 Matt Kabus as Sean O'Connell
 Shannon Eubanks as Bastianna Natale
 Yasmine Al-Bustami as Monique Deveraux
 Diana Chiritescu and Natalie Dreyfuss as Cassie (herself; possessed by Esther)
 Tasha Ames as Eve
 Jesse C. Boyd as Cary
 Owiso Odera as Papa Tunde
 Elyse Levesque as Genevieve
 Aubrey DeVaney and Alexa Yeames as Abigail
 Nathan Parsons as Jackson Kenner
 Chase Coleman as Oliver
 Teri Wyble as Clara Summerlin (possessed by Celeste DuBois)
 Peta Sergeant as Francesca Correa

Special guest 
Michael Trevino as Tyler Lockwood

Guest 
 Nathaniel Buzolic as Kol Mikaelson
 Devon Allowitz as Henrik Mikaelson
 McCarrie McCausland as Marcel Gerard (young)
 Johnny Walter as Dwayne
 Morgan Alexandria as Lana
 Aiden Flowers as Klaus Mikaelson (young)
 Perry Cox as Elijah Mikaelson (young)
 Callie McClincy as Rebekah Mikaelson (young)
 Yusuf Gatewood as Vincent Griffith (possessed by Finn Mikaelson)

Notes

Episodes

Production

Reception
The first season received mixed reviews with 7.8 from IMDB. On Rotten Tomatoes the season holds a 57% based on 28 reviews, with an average rating of 5.61/10. The critics consensus reads, "The Originals may overwhelm casual viewers with its myriad twists and bevy of supernatural beings, but this is a sleek, atmospheric Vampire Diaries spinoff with potential."

Ratings

References 

1
2013 American television seasons
2014 American television seasons